Carmel Myers (April 9, 1899 – November 9, 1980) was an American actress who achieved her greatest successes in silent film.

Early life 
Myers was born in San Francisco, the daughter of Isidore Myers, a Russian-Jewish rabbi who was born in Russia but raised in Australia, and Anna Jacobson Myers, an Austrian-Jew. She had an older brother, Zion, and she was a cousin of director Mark Sandrich and photographer Ruth Harriet Louise. Carmel's father was active in campaigns for women's suffrage, abolition of capital punishment, and zionism. He also was a noted scholar. The family moved to Los Angeles in 1905.

Myers attended Los Angeles High School but left after D. W. Griffith gave her bit part in the film Intolerance (1916), for which her father was an unpaid consultant. She continued her education at a school for young actors.

Myers helped her brother become a writer and director in Hollywood.

Career

Silent film and theater 

Myers left for New York City, where she acted mainly in theater for the next two years. She was signed by Universal, where she emerged as a popular actress in vamp roles. Her most popular film from this period—which does not feature her in a vamp role—is probably the romantic comedy All Night, opposite Rudolph Valentino, who was then a little-known actor. She also worked with him in A Society Sensation. By 1924, she was working for Metro-Goldwyn-Mayer, making such films as Broadway After Dark, which also starred Adolphe Menjou, Norma Shearer, and Anna Q. Nilsson.

In 1925, she appeared in arguably her most famous role, that of the Egyptian vamp Iras in Ben-Hur, who tries to seduce both Messala (Francis X. Bushman) and Ben-Hur himself (Ramón Novarro). This film was a boost to her career, and she appeared in major roles throughout the 1920s, including Tell It to the Marines in 1926 with Lon Chaney, Sr., William Haines, and Eleanor Boardman. Myers appeared in Four Walls and Dream of Love, both with Joan Crawford in 1928; and in The Show of Shows (1929), a showcase of popular contemporary film actors.

Sound films, radio, and television 

Myers had a fairly successful sound career, mostly in supporting roles, perhaps due to her image as a vamp rather than as a sympathetic heroine. Subsequently, she began giving more attention to her private life following the birth of her son in May 1932. Amongst her popular sound films are Svengali (1931) and The Mad Genius (1931), both with John Barrymore and Marian Marsh, and a small role in 1944's The Conspirators, which featured Paul Henreid, Peter Lorre, and Sydney Greenstreet.

In 1939, Myers performed for 13 weeks on the Resinol radio program that was broadcast twice weekly from station KHJ and carried on the Don Lee Network.

In 1951, Myers had a celebrity interview TV program, The Carmel Myers Show, on ABC. In 1952, she formed Carmel Myers Productions, a firm for producing radio and TV programs. The company's productions included Mark Hellinger Tales, a transcribed series of 30-minute radio dramas with Edward Arnold as narrator and Cradle of Stars, a 30-minute filmed TV series with Gregory Ratoff as director and star.

Later, she focused on a career in real estate and her perfume distribution company. In 1976, Myers was one of the very few silent stars who were cast in Won Ton Ton, the Dog Who Saved Hollywood, a comedy featuring cameos by dozens of Hollywood stars of the past.

Book
In 1952, Doubleday & Company published Don't Think About It, a 64-page book by Myers. Based on her experiences following the death of her husband, the book related her philosophy for emotional survival after a person has a tragedy in his or her life.

Personal life 

Myers married attorney and song writer Isidore "I.B." Kornblum on July 16, 1919; they divorced in 1923.

Myers and attorney Ralph H. Blum married on June 9, 1929, and had three children: author Ralph H. Blum (born 1932), known for his works on divination through Norse runes, and two adopted daughters, actress and radio personality Susan Adams Kennedy (born 1940) and television producer Mary Cossette (born 1941). Myers and Blum purchased Gloria Swanson's Sunset Boulevard home.

On October 30, 1951, Myers married Paramount Pictures executive Alfred W. Schwalberg in Brooklyn. They were married until his death in 1974.

Death 
Myers died of a heart attack on November 9, 1980, in Los Angeles Medical Center at the age of 81. She was buried near her parents at Home of Peace Cemetery in East Los Angeles. Her epitaph reads "L'Chaim", which in English translates to "To life".

Partial filmography 

 Georgia Pearce (1915)
 Intolerance (1916) as Favorite of the Harem (uncredited)
 The Heiress at Coffee Dan's (1916) as Waitress (uncredited)
 The Bad Boy (1917) as Bit Role (uncredited)
 Stage Struck (1917) as Bit Role (uncredited)
 A Love Sublime (1917) as Toinette
 A Daughter of the Poor (1917) as Hazel Fleming
 Might and the Man (1917) as Winifred
 The Haunted Pajamas (1917) as Frances Kirkland
 Sirens of the Sea (1917) as Julie
 The Lash of Power (1917) as Marion Sherwood
 My Unmarried Wife (1918) as Mary Cunningham
 The Wife He Bought (1918) as Janice Brieson
 The Girl in the Dark (1918) as Lois Fox
 The Wine Girl (1918) as Bona
 The Marriage Lie (1918) as Eileen Orton
 A Broadway Scandal (1918) as Nenette Bisson
 The City of Tears (1918) as Rosa Carillo
 The Dream Lady (1918) as Rosamond Gilbert
 A Society Sensation (1918, short) as Sydney Parmelee
 All Night (1918) as Elizabeth Lane
 Who Will Marry Me? (1919) as Rosie Sanguinetti
 The Little White Savage (1919) as Minnie Lee
 In Folly's Trail (1920) as Lita O'Farrell
 The Gilded Dream (1920) as Leona
 Beautifully Trimmed (1920) as Norine Lawton
 The Mad Marriage (1921) as Jane Judd
 The Dangerous Moment (1921) as Sylvia Palprini
 Cheated Love (1921) as Sonya Schonema
 The Kiss (1921) as Erolinda Vargas
 Breaking Through (1921) as Bettina Lowden
 A Daughter of the Law (1921) as Nora Hayes
 The Love Gambler (1922) as Jean McClelland
 The Danger Point (1922) as Alice Torrance
 The Last Hour (1923) as Saidee McCall
 The Famous Mrs. Fair (1923) as Angy Brice
 Good-By Girls! (1923) as Florence Brown
 The Little Girl Next Door (1923) as Milly Amory
 Mary of the Movies (1923) as Herself (uncredited)
 Slave of Desire (1923) as Countess Fedora
 The Dancer of the Nile (1923) as Arvia
 The Love Pirate (1923) as Ruby Le Maar
 Reno (1923) as Mrs. Dora Carson Tappan
 Poisoned Paradise: The Forbidden Story of Monte Carlo (1924) as Mrs. Belmire
 Beau Brummel (1924) as Lady Hester Stanhope
 Broadway After Dark (1924) as Lenore Vance
 Babbitt (1924) as Tanis Judique
 Garragan (1924)
 Ben-Hur: A Tale of the Christ (1925) as Iras
 The Devil's Circus (1926) as Yonna
 The Gay Deceiver (1926) as Countess de Sano
 Tell It to the Marines (1926) as Zaya
 Camille (1926, short) as Agatha
 The Demi-Bride (1927) as Madame Girard
 The Understanding Heart (1927) as Kelcey Dale
 The Girl from Rio (1927) as Lola
 Sorrell and Son (1927) as Flo Palfrey
 A Certain Young Man (1928) as Mrs. Crutchley
 Prowlers of the Sea (1928) as Mercedes
 Four Walls (1928) as Bertha
 Dream of Love (1928) as The Countess
 The Ghost Talks (1929) as Marie Haley
 Careers (1929) as The Woman
 The Careless Age (1929) as Rayetta
 Broadway Scandals (1929) as Valeska
 The Red Sword (1929) as Katherine
 The Show of Shows (1929) as Performer in 'Ladies of the Ensemble' Number
 The Ship from Shanghai (1930) as Viola Thorpe
 A Lady Surrenders (1930) as Sonia
 The Lion and the Lamb (1931) as Inez
 Svengali (1931) as Madame Honori
 Pleasure (1931) as Mrs. Dorothy Whitley
 Chinatown After Dark (1931) as Madame Ying Su
 The Mad Genius (1931) as Sonya Preskoya
 Nice Women (1931) as Dorothy Drew
 No Living Witness (1942) as Emillia
 The Countess of Monte Cristo (1934) as Flower Girl
 Lady for a Night (1942) as Mrs. Dickson
 The Conspirators (1944) as Baroness von Kluge (uncredited)
 George White's Scandals (1945) as Leslie (uncredited)
 Whistle Stop (1946) as Estelle
 Won Ton Ton, the Dog Who Saved Hollywood (1976) as Woman Journalist (final film role)

References

External links 

 
 
 Carmel Myers Photo Gallery at Silent-Movies.org
 Carmel Myers at Virtual History

1899 births
1980 deaths
20th-century American actresses
Actresses from San Francisco
American film actresses
American people of Austrian-Jewish descent
American silent film actresses
Burials at Home of Peace Cemetery
Jewish American actresses
Los Angeles High School alumni
Metro-Goldwyn-Mayer contract players
20th-century American Jews